The 41st Kerala Film Critics Association Awards, honouring the best Malayalam films released in 2017, were announced in April 2018. The awards were distributed at an event held in Kayamkulam on 15 October 2019.

Winners

Main Awards
 Best Film: Thondimuthalum Driksakshiyum
 Best Director: Jayaraj (Bhayanakam)
 Best Actor: Fahadh Faasil (Thondimuthalum Driksakshiyum)
 Best Actress: Manju Warrier (Udaharanam Sujatha)
 Second Best Film: Aalorukkam
 Second Best Actor: Tovino Thomas (Mayaanadhi)
 Second Best Actress: Aishwarya Lekshmi (Mayaanadhi)
 Best Screenplay: Sajeev Pazhoor
 Best Art Director: Maya Siva (Dhan)
 Best Cinematographer: Nikhil. S Praveen (Bhayanakam)
 Best Music Director: 4 Musics
 Best Children's Film: Ilakal Pacha Pookkal Manja
 Best Lyricist: M.G.Sadasivan
 Best Male Playback Singer: Kallara Gopan
 Best Female Playback Singer: Jyotsna
 Best Popular Film: Ramaleela
 Best Child Artist: Master Alok, Baby Meenakshi
 Best Editing: Ayoob Khan
 Best Sound Design: Renganaath Ravee
 Best Makeup Artist: N. G. Roshan
 Best Costumes: S. B. Satheesh

Special Jury Awards
 Direction: Harikumar (Clint)
 Direction: Unni Pranavam (Hadiya)
 Acting: Sheelu Abraham (Sadrishavakyam 24:29)
 Lyrics: Dr. Venugopal (Eliyammachiyude Adhyathe Christmas)
 Socially Relevant Film: M. A. Nishad (Kinar)

Honourary Awards
 Chalachitra Ratnam Award: M. K. Arjunan
 Ruby Jubilee Award: Indrans
 Chalachitra Prathibha Award: Balu Kiriyath,	Devan, Jalaja

References

External links
 "List of recipients of the Kerala Film Critics Association Awards" (in Malayalam)
 "Kerala Film Critics Association Awards 2017: Official press release" (in Malayalam)

2017 Indian film awards
2017